Marina Nikolaevna Abroskina de García (21 March 1967 — 17 January 2011) was a Russian female professional basketball player. She was also Mexican citizen.

Abroskina died on January 17, 2011 from the effects of a brain tumor.

Honours
European Championship U16 (USSR): 
Gold: 1984
European Championship (USSR): 
Gold: 1989
Central America Championship  (Mexico):  
Gold: 1991
Soviet Women's Basketball Championship (Dynamo Volgograd):
Bronze: 1989, 1990

References

External links
Profile at archive.fiba.com

1967 births
2011 deaths
Sportspeople from Volgograd
Soviet women's basketball players
Russian women's basketball players
Mexican women's basketball players
Power forwards (basketball)
FIBA EuroBasket-winning players